Miss Europe 1952 was the 15th edition of the Miss Europe pageant and the fourth edition under the Mondial Events Organization. It was held in Naples, Italy on August 19, 1952. Günseli Başar of Turkey, was crowned Miss Europe 1952 by out going titleholder Hanni Schall of Austria.

Results

Placements

Contestants 

 - Ingeborg Freuis
 - Anne-Marie Pauwels
 - Judy Breen
 - Eeva Maria Hellas (Eva Hellas)
 - Nicole Drouin
 - Vera Marks
 - Virginia Petimezaki
 - Elisabeth "Betty 'Beppie'" van Proosdij
 - Eithne Dunne
 - Stefania "Fanny" Landini
 - Anne Marie Tistler
 - Sylvia Müller
 - Günseli Başar†

Notes

Withdrawals

Returns

"Comité Officiel et International Miss Europe" Competition

From 1951 to 2002 there was a rival Miss Europe competition organized by the "Comité Officiel et International Miss Europe". This was founded in 1950 by Jean Raibaut in Paris, the headquarters later moved to Marseille. The winners wore different titles like Miss Europe, Miss Europa or Miss Europe International.

This year, the competition took place in Amsterdam, Holland. There were 10 delegates all from their own countries. At the end, Judy Breen of Great Britain was crowned as Miss Europa 1952. Breen succeeded predecessor Jacqueline Grenton of Switzerland.

Placements

Contestants

 - Vera Marks
 - Judy Breen
 - Elisabeth "Betty 'Beppie'" van Proosdij
 - Anita Ekberg†

References

External links 
 

Miss Europe
1952 beauty pageants
1952 in Italy
1952 in the Netherlands